This is a list of years in Mongolia. See also Timeline of Mongolian history.

18th century

19th century

20th century

21st century

 
History of Mongolia
Mongolia history-related lists
Mongolia